Larry Earl Schweikart (born April 21, 1951) is an American historian and retired professor of history at the University of Dayton. During the 1980s and 1990s, he authored numerous scholarly publications. In recent years, he has authored popular books, including A Patriot's History of the United States (2004) and 48 Liberal Lies About American History. According to professors Guy Burton and Ted Goertzel, "Schweikart and Allen are both history professors with distinguished publication records."

Early life and education
Born in Mesa, Arizona to a cattle ranching family, Schweikart graduated from Arizona State University in 1972 with a B.A. in Political science. He entered the ASU Master's program in 1977, writing a national Phi Alpha Theta prize-winning article on the Peary diaries. He received his M.A. in History in 1980. He then received a Ph.D. in History from the University of California, Santa Barbara in 1983. By the time he had graduated, Schweikart had already written two books and several academic articles as a graduate student.

Career
Schweikart took a one-year position at the University of Wisconsin–Platteville Richland. In 1985, he received an appointment to the University of Dayton. There he taught business and economic history, then military history. He was a full professor, and in 1987 was honored for outstanding scholarship. Schweikart retired in 2016.

In 1999 he published a history of American business, The Entrepreneurial Adventure. In 2004 he co-authored the book A Patriot's History of the United States with Michael Allen. In 2006, he published America's Victories. In 2006, he published 48 Liberal Lies About American History.

Schweikart is active on Twitter, operating under various accounts and commenting on political matters. During the 2018 United States elections, he claimed that then-Congressman Beto O'Rourke was sending busloads of illegal immigrants to polling booths and paying them $100 to vote.

In December 2020, President Donald Trump appointed Schweikart to the Board of Directors of the National Board for Education Sciences, which advises leaders of the Department of Education’s research division.

Bibliography

Scholarly books
 California Bankers (New York: Simon & Schuster, 1994).
 Banking in the American West from Gold Rush to Deregulation (co-authored with Lynne Doti) (University of Oklahoma Press, 1991).
 Making Change: South Carolina Banking in the Twentieth Century (co-authored with John G. Sproat) (Columbia, S.C.: Bruccoli Clark Layman, 1990).
 Banking in the American South from the Age of Jackson to Reconstruction (Louisiana State University Press, 1987).
 Trident (with D.D. Dalgleish) (Southern Illinois University Press, 1984).
 Banking in the West: A Collection of Essays (Editor) (Sunflower University Press, 1984).
 History of Banking in Arizona (University of Arizona Press, 1982).

Textbooks and general reference books
Schweikart, Larry, and Bradley J. Birzer. The American West. (Wiley Desk Reference" series) Hoboken, N.J.: John Wiley & Sons, 2003. 
 The Entrepreneurial Adventure: A History of American Enterprise (Ft. Worth, Texas: Harcourt Brace, 1999) (textbook)

Books edited
 Encyclopedia of American Business History: Banking and Finance, to 1913 editor in chief (New York: Facts on File, 1990)
 Encyclopedia of American Business History: Banking and Finance, 1913-1989 editor in chief (New York: Facts on File, 1990)
 Voices of UD:Historical Interpretations of the University of Dayton, ed. and principal author (Dayton, Ohio: University of Dayton, 1999).

Peer-reviewed journal articles (selected)
“From Hard Money to Branch Banking: California Banking in the Gold Rush Economy,” with Lynne Pierson Doti, in James Rawls and Richard J. Orsi, eds., "A Golden State: Mining and Economic Development in Gold Rush California," special edition of California History, Winter 1998-99, 209-232.
“The Panic of 1857: Causes, Transmission, and Containment” (co-authored with Charles Calomiris), Journal of Economic History, LI, December 1990, pp. 807–34.
“A New Perspective on George Wingfield and Nevada Banking, 1920-33,” Nevada Historical Quarterly, XXXV, vol. 35, Winter 1992, pp. 162–76.
“American Commercial Banking: A Bibliographic Survey,” Business History Review, vol. 65, Fall 1992, pp. 606–61.
“Alabama’s Antebellum Banks: New Interpretations, New Evidence,” The Alabama Review, XXXVIII, June 1985, pp. 202–21.
“Secession and Southern Banks,” Civil War History, XXXI, June 1985, pp. 111–25.
“Tennessee’s Antebellum Banks, Part I,” Tennessee Historical Quarterly, XLV, Summer 1986, pp. 119–32.
“Southern Banking and Economic Growth in the Antebellum Period: A Reassessment,” Journal of Southern History, LIII, February 1987, pp. 19–36.
“Private Bankers in the Antebellum South,” Southern Studies, XXV, Summer 1986, pp. 125–34.
“Jacksonian Ideology, Currency Control, and `Central Banking’: A Reappraisal,” The Historian, LI, November 1988, pp. 781-02.
“Banking in Early New Mexico from the Civil War to the Roaring Twenties,” New Mexico Historical Review, LXIII, January 1988, pp. 1–22.
“Financing the Postwar Housing Boom in Phoenix and Los Angeles, 1945-60" (co-authored with Lynne Doti), Pacific Historical Review, LVIII, May 1989, pp. 173–94.
“Collusion or Competition: Another Look at Arizona Banking in the Postwar Period, 1950-1964,” Journal of Arizona History, XXVIII, Summer 1987, pp. 189–200.
“You Count It: The Birth of Banking in Arizona,” Journal of Arizona History, XXII, Fall 1981, pp. 349–68.
“Brophy vs. Douglas: A Case Study in Frontier Corporate Control,” Journal of the West, XXIII, April 1984, pp. 49–55.
“Antebellum Banking in Arkansas: New Evidence, New Interpretations,” Southern Studies, XXVI, Fall 1987, pp. 188–201.
“Financing Urban Growth: Entrepreneurial Creativity and Western Cities, 1945-75,” Urban Studies, XXVI, February 1990, pp. 177–86.
“Polar Revisionism and the Peary Claim: The Diary of Robert E. Peary,” The Historian, XLVIII, May 1986, pp. 341–58.
“Stand By to Repel Historians: Modern Scholarship and Caribbean Pirates, 1650-1725"” (co-authored with Richard Burg), The Historian, XLVI, March 1984, pp. 219–34.

Book chapters (selected)
“Banking and Finance in North America, 1607-1996,” in Alice Teichova et al., eds, Banking, Trade, and Industry (Cambridge University Press, 1997), 297-314.
“Entrepreneurial Aspects of Antebellum Banking,” in American Business History: Case Studies ed. C. Joseph Pusateri and Henry Dethloff (New York: Harlan Davidson, 1987), pp. 122–39.

Popular books
Schweikart, Larry (2022). Dragonslayers: Six Presidents and Their War with the Swamp Bombardier Books; 2022, ISBN 978-1637581889

Schweikart, Larry, and Dave Dougherty. A Patriot's History of the Modern World, Vol. II: From the Cold War to the Age of Entitlement, 1945-2012. New York: Sentinel; 2013 .
Schweikart, Larry, and Dave Dougherty. A Patriot's History of the Modern World, Vol. I: From America's Exceptional Ascent to the Atomic Bomb, 1898-1945. New York: Sentinel; 2012 . 
 Schweikart, Larry, Dave Dougherty, Michael Allen, and Larry Schweikart. The Patriot's History Reader: Essential Documents for Every American. New York: Sentinel, 2011. 
Schweikart, Larry. What Would the Founders Say?: A Patriot's Answers to America's Most Pressing Problems. New York: Sentinel, 2011. 
 Schweikart, Larry. Seven Events That Made America America: And Proved That the Founding Fathers Were Right All Along. New York: Sentinel, 2010.
 Schweikart, Larry, and Lynne Pierson Doti. American Entrepreneur: The Fascinating Stories of the People Who Defined Business in the United States. New York: AMACOM, American Management Association, 2010. 
 Schweikart, Larry. 48 Liberal Lies About American History: (That You Probably Learned in School). New York: Sentinel, 2008. .
Schweikart, Larry. America's Victories: Why the U.S. Wins Wars and Will Win the War on Terror. New York: Sentinel, 2006. .
Schweikart, Larry, and Michael Allen. A Patriot's History of the United States: From Columbus's Great Discovery to the War on Terror. New York: Sentinel, 2004. .

References

 "Larry (Earl) Schweikart," in Contemporary Authors (Gale: 2002 and 2010 editions)

External links
 University of Dayton profile (archived)
 
 A Patriot's History author book website
 Wild World of History author blog, courses and other informational website
 
 In Depth interview with Schweikart, March 3, 2013

21st-century American historians
21st-century American male writers
Historians of the United States
Writers from Mesa, Arizona
Arizona State University alumni
University of California, Santa Barbara alumni
University of Wisconsin–Madison faculty
University of Dayton faculty
Living people
1951 births
People from Mesa, Arizona
Conservatism in the United States
Historians from Ohio
American male non-fiction writers